Calbuco River is a river in Cautín Province, Chile.

The river is originating in Llaima Volcano and ending in Vilcún River, commune of Vilcún.

References

Rivers of Chile
Landforms of Araucanía Region